Cebe (also known as Pazapun) is a village in the Çemişgezek District, Tunceli Province, Turkey. The village is populated by Turks and had a population of 270 in 2021.

The hamlet of Gözecik is attached to the village.

References 

Villages in Çemişgezek District